2020 Georgia Senate election can refer to:

 2020 Georgia State Senate election
 2020–21 United States Senate election in Georgia
 2020–21 United States Senate special election in Georgia